Solomon Soladin "S. S." Calhoon (January 2, 1838 – November 10, 1908) was an American judge and attorney. He was a justice of the Supreme Court of Mississippi from 1900 to 1908.

Early life 
Calhoon was born January 2, 1838, near Brandenburg, Kentucky, to parents Louisiana and George Calhoon. He went to school in Canton, Mississippi and attended Cumberland University in Tennessee.

He attended the University of Mississippi, graduating in 1867. While there, he was a member of the Fraternity of Delta Psi (aka St. Anthony Hall).

Career 
In 1857, he was the private secretary of Mississippi governor William McWillie. The year after, he was the secretary for the Mississippi Senate. From 1858 to 1859, he was a newspaper editor of the Yazoo Democrat and the States' Right Democrat.

During the American Civil War Calhoon served in the Confederate Army, eventually becoming lieutenant colonel of the 9th Mississippi Infantry Regiment.

In 1867, he was granted admission to the bar in Mississippi.  He was the president of the 1890 constitutional convention, which created the 1890 Constitution of Mississippi. He became a justice of the Supreme Court of Mississippi from 1900 to 1908. He succeeded Thomas H. Woods, the previous Justice.

Personal life 
On December 21, 1965, he married Margaret McWillie. Calhoon died in Jackson, Mississippi, on November 10, 1908.

References

External links

1838 births
1908 deaths
People from Meade County, Kentucky
Cumberland University alumni
19th-century American lawyers
Editors of Mississippi newspapers
19th-century American newspaper editors
Confederate States Army officers
Lawyers from Jackson, Mississippi
Justices of the Mississippi Supreme Court
University of Mississippi alumni
St. Anthony Hall